Grupo Desportivo Águias de Camarate is a Portuguese sports club, located in the parish of Camarate, municipality of Loures, district of Lisbon.

History 
The club was founded in 1950 and its current president is called Frederico Dias.

In the late 1940s, a group of young people from our parish, who worked in several factories in Sacavém, decided to start a club to participate in tournaments that took place at the time, having acquired the equipment from the then Águias de Sacavém, hence the name and foundation of Grupo Desportivo Águias de Camarate, which took place on August 1, 1950, with its temporary headquarters as a dependency of the famous "Taberna Vardasca", made available by the owner at the time. 

As it is normal the foundation of a club drags other people and other ideas, having been decided then to rent an old mill in the Alley of the Barbantes that worked several years like the first headquarters of the Eagles of Camarate, affiliated the club in the AFL and the soccer field was made, which at the time was considered heroic, due first to the incidences of the terrain, and following the means available at the time (beginning of years 50), but the caroliçe in the Eagles of Camarate was never a vain word and the difficulties were always overcome, since the Eagles of Camarate began to be a well-known and respected club at district level having won some district titles. Meanwhile, the Eagles of Camarate was not only a sport that also had an Athletics team that won everything in terms of popular races, but also the cultural part had a little corner that today still remembers with much nostalgia and affection, was a scenic group that made several performances, with the intention of raising funds for improvements in the club and the popular marches of the Eagles of Camarate and including one of them obtained a 2nd place in a contest in the Coliseu dos Recreios that participated all the marches of the great Lisbon. But the Águias de Camarate did not stop and in the late 50s, it jumps from the headquarters of the Alley of the Barbantes, to the present facilities, and here it has been a debating of efforts from then until our days.

In short, the Camarate Eagles rented a backyard and a run down building and the carolice and effort of many members, friends and management over the years have erected one of the best social centers of the county of Loures, where they pontificate work rooms, meetings and leisure, a gymnasium and a bar-restaurant, our pavilion managed to move around 100 athletes daily in the gymnastics and karate, nowadays only with the new modality of the Kickboxing club. In our headquarters there is a work that is highly praised by all who visit and demonstrates the race and the will of the workers of this club, it is a tunnel excavated by hand and gives access to our bar that has a length of 15 meters by 2 meters of height and 1,25 meters of width.

Well, from the time of 92 a youthful and experienced management was elected and the works of the alignment of our playground and headquarters did not stop as well as the purchase of a bus on July 27, 1993 was carried out deed of the purchase of the headquarters that was proposed the direction at the time, practically the same direction was reelected.

All of the above summarized have the support of CML, parish council, commerce and local industry, as well as all the members and sympathizers of Grupo Desportivo Águias de Camarate.

Sports History

Achievements

Seniors 
Season: 1959/60 - Finalist in the cup of Lisbon

Season: 1977/78 - District Champion 3rd Division 

Season: 1978/79 - District Champion 2nd Division 

Season: 1979/80 - Deputy First Division District Champion

Season: 1980/81 - Dispute of the 3rd National Division

(November 7, 1982) - Historical match for the cup of Portugal played against Sporting Clube de Braga 

Season: 1995/96 - District Champion 1st division  

Seasons: 1996/97; 1997/98; 1998/99; 1999/2000 - Dispute of the 3rd national division 

Season: 2000/01 - Dispute 2nd division (B) national

Season: 2001/02 - Dispute of the 3rd national division

Juniors 

Season: 1984/85 - Champion 2nd district division

Season: 2003/04 - Climb the division of honor

Season: 2006/07 - Champion 2nd district division

Juveniles 

Season: 1987/88 - Champion 2nd District Division

Season: 1989/90 - Dispute of the national championship

Season: 2001/02 - Ascent there is division of honor

Initiates 

Season: 1988/89 - Winner of the extraordinary tournament of the 2nd division

Season: 2007/08 - National Champion

Season: 2017/18 - Win the "Europa League/Champions League in Loures"

Formation 
The beginning of the Grupo Desportivo Águias de Camarate in schools takes place in 1999/00. He still had hardly given the first paços and they obtain a brilliant participation in the IV Iberian Tournament of schools, being able to be the best classified equipment of the county of Loures.

In 2006, the project of the schools of Grupo Desportivo Águias de Camarate begins, dream of the ball, which currently has more than 190 children.

Since 2012 the training project has been named AC Foot and has teams of Initiates, Infants A1, A2 and B, Benjamins A and B, Traquinas and Petizes.

History in the Taça de Portugal 

1980/81 - 1st Participation (1W-1L)

Águias de Camarate had their first appearance in the Portuguese Cup on September 28, 1980 in a game against Seixal FC, Camarate's 3-1 victory. They were eliminated on October 26 against the Trade and Industry with a 2-1 defeat.

1982/83 - 2nd Participation (1W-1L)

In their second appearance on the so-called "Proof Queen" of Portuguese football were headed to Vila Franca de Xira to face Vilafranquense, GDAC won the match 1-0 and went on to the 1/64 Round of 32 where got to face SC Braga in their field. Game played until today remembered by many, by the delivery of the players (who faced equally against an already renamed Braga) and by the bad weather that was felt. GDAC lost the match 2-1 (Manel's goal).

1986/87 - 3rd Participation (1L)

Third appearance, without great history, GDAC were eliminated in the first game on October 11, 1986 by Monte da Caparica AC 3-1.

1990/91 - 4th Participation (1W-2D-1L)
GDAC started the Portuguese Cup against CDR Massamá in the 1/512 round of 32. GDAC tied the first game in Camarate to 1 goal, in the playoff game in Massamá ended with a 5-3 victory for Camarate. In the next tie GDAC went to the field of Quimigal to draw a new tie to a goal, in the playoff game in Camarate they lost 2-1 and were thus eliminated.

1997/98 - 5th Participation (1W-1L)

On September 7, 1997, in the First Round, GDAC received the Algarve's Louletano and beat the Algarve 2-1. In the second round it was GDAC turn to go to Algarve to face the Immortal of Albufeira (II Division) but GDAC suffered their biggest defeat in this event, 7-0.

1998/99 - 6th Participation (1L)

The following year GDAC were back, for the first time GDAC club was going to the cup of Portugal two years in a row. GDAC had to go to U. Tires and end up losing 3-2.

1999/00 - 7th Participation (1L)

Third consecutive season in the Cup, as GDAC were in the 2nd division did not play the first round of the Cup and GDAC moved directly to the 2nd. GDAC went to Coimbra to face the local Union, final result was a 2-1 loss.

2000/01 - 8th Participation (3W-1L)

In the first round GDAC went to Sintra to face the always complicated Sintrense team. GDAC won the game 3-2. In the second round received Pinhalnovense, 3-1 for GDAC and a stamp for the next round. On November 1 SC Lamego comes to Camarate to play in the third round of the cup, GDAC won 3-0 clear. The Camaras Eagles had never had a series of victories like this in the Portuguese Cup! The fourth round was also the last for GDAC. GDAC had a trip to Póvoa de Varzim to face the strong team of the Varzim that season went up to the 1st Division. On a muddy pitch in the middle of the winter, the game naturally fell to the poveiros despite the excellent replica of GDAC team, essentially in the first part of the match (1-0 at halftime). In the second half Varzim took the match and won the match 4-0 and ended the best ever performance of GD Águias de Camarate in the Portuguese Cup. GDAC can recall what the Record newspaper wrote about this meeting in: Varzim-Á. Camarate, 4-0: poor work of the poveiros.

2001/02 - 9th Participation (1W-1L)

First Qualifying, GDAC received and won the Coruchense by 4-3. In the second round GDAC faced the Union of Madeira (at the time it rose to 1st for Div.Honra) in Madeira, and GDAC were eliminated from the cup after a 4-0 defeat.

2002/03 - 10th Participation (1W-1L)

First Round, Camarate 2-0 Santacruzense da Madeira. In the second round GDAC received the mythical Barreirense and lost 3-0 and after six consecutive seasons to be present in this event, this was the last game of the Grupo Desportivo Águias de Camarate in the Portuguese Cup to this day.

Leagues

Stadium 

Football field of Quinta dos Barros in Bairro do Grilo, with a capacity of 1500 spectators.

Dimension of lawn, 91 meters long by 53 meters wide.

Football

Sports material and sponsors

Equipment

Current equipment 
 1º - Green and white sweater, shorts and green socks;
 2º - Black sweater, shorts and black socks.

Goalkeeper's uniforms 
 Yellow shirt, shorts and black socks;
 Pink shirt, shorts and black stockings.

Equipments 
 2017-18
 1º - Green and white sweater, shorts and green socks;
 2º - Black sweater, shorts and black socks.

Kickboxing

Arena of Camarate began in 2007 by the master Armandino Saints 4º Dan (rank) and its adjunct Guilherme Carvalho 1º Dan (rank), student of the master Armandino Santos. They then started the activity of Kickboxing and Muay Thai in the pavilion of the headquarters of the Eagles of Camarate, and the following year also with the Boxing.

(Text by the author of Mestre Armandino Santos, September 2015. Original text in Portuguese.

Titles 
World Champions, European, Iberian and National, some still in active others already retired and others who no longer represent the Arena Camarate. Big names in Portuguese Kickboxing and Muaythai from the great school Camarate Arena! 

Élson Patrick, Filipe Oliveira, Luis Dionísio, Ricardo Cabral, Tiago Borges, Diogo Silva, Francisco Matos, Marco Romão e Alex Martins.

Recognition 
Entrepreneurial Club - 
Grupo Desportivo Águias de Camarate was awarded the 2017 Entrepreneurial Club Award by the Portuguese Kickboxing and Muaythai Federation for the club's work in favor of Kickboxing and Muaythai. This award was presented by the president of the Federation Ana Melo to the coach of this distinguished group, Armandino Santos, during the Gala of the 30th anniversary of the Portuguese Kickboxing and Muaythai Federation, held last February 20, 2018, at the Champalimaud Foundation. CML was represented. The Municipality of Loures, reunited on February 28, 2018, reinforces this distinction for the work done for the Camarate community in the sports, social and associative level.as "Águias de Camarate, Clube Empreendedor 2017"

Brazilian Jiu Jitsu 
Since the beginning of June 2018, the Arena de Camarate has become available to combat sports practitioners another modality. Brazilian jiu-jitsu under the supervision of Mestre Bruno Nascimento.

Cycling 
The sport in Camarate has one more modality. In 2018, Grupo Desportivo Águias de Camarate and the Trilhos do Oriente BTT Team signed a protocol that promotes local sport and adds another modality to one of the most reputed clubs in the Municipality of Loures.

References

External links 
 Official club website 

1950 establishments in Portugal
Football clubs in Portugal
Football clubs in Lisbon
Multi-sport clubs in Portugal